The 9th Television State Awards festival (Sinhala: 9 වැනි රූපවාහිනී රාජ්‍ය සම්මාන උලෙළ), was held to honor the television programs of 2013 Sinhala television on January 12, 2014, at the Bandaranaike Memorial International Conference Hall, Colombo 07, Sri Lanka. The event was organized by the Ministry of Culture and the Arts, State Television Advisory Council and Arts Council of Sri Lanka. The Honorable Speaker of Sri Lanka Chamal Rajapaksa was the chief guest.

At the award ceremony, veteran actor Berty Gunathilake, veteran media personalities Noelin Honter and Kamalini Selvarajan were received the Lifetime Achievement Awards. In addition, 11 awards were presented to the artists under the Pioneer Awards and awards were presented to all its artists on the occasion of the third anniversary of the telecast of Sri Lanka's first teledrama "Dimuthu Muthu". Dudley Rajapaksa, Staff Assistant, Department of Cultural Affairs, Founder of Rupavahini State Awards Ceremony was received a special tribute.

Awards

Media Section

Television Serial Section

See also
 14th Sri Lankan Television State Awards

References

Sri Lankan Television State Awards
Sri Lankan Television State Awards